Robert Craig Kent (November 28, 1828 – April 30, 1905) was an attorney and political figure from the Commonwealth of Virginia.  A graduate of Princeton University, Kent was admitted to the Virginia Bar in 1853 and commenced the practice of law in Wytheville.  After several years of successful private practice, Kent was elected as the Commonwealth's Attorney for Wythe County, then twice to the Virginia House of Delegates.  In 1894, he won election to a four-year term as the 17th Lieutenant Governor of Virginia.

Sources

1828 births
1905 deaths
Democratic Party members of the Virginia House of Delegates
Lieutenant Governors of Virginia
Princeton University alumni
Virginia lawyers
19th-century American politicians
19th-century American lawyers
People from Wytheville, Virginia
County and city Commonwealth's Attorneys in Virginia